The 2002 FIG Rhythmic Gymnastics World Cup Final was the fifth edition of the Rhythmic Gymnastics World Cup Final, held from November 30 to December 2, 2002 in Stuttgart, Germany. The competition was officially organized by the International Gymnastics Federation as the last stage of a series of competitions through the 2001–2002 season.

Medalists

Medal table

References

Rhythmic Gymnastics World Cup
International gymnastics competitions hosted by Germany
2002 in gymnastics